Samuel Hall (born 20 August 1995) is a British judoka.

Judo career
Hall is a four times champion of Great Britain, winning the British Judo Championships in 2016, 2017, 2019 and 2021.

He is the gold medallist of the 2021 Judo Grand Prix Zagreb in the -60 kg category. At the 2021 Judo Grand Slam Abu Dhabi held in Abu Dhabi, United Arab Emirates, he won one of the bronze medals in his event.

References

External links
 
 

1995 births
Living people
British male judoka
Commonwealth Games silver medallists for England
Commonwealth Games medallists in judo
Judoka at the 2022 Commonwealth Games
Medallists at the 2022 Commonwealth Games